The format for the 2009–10 season saw the number of Premier League clubs reduced from 22 to 12 with each team playing each other twice. The 2009 season marked the last season before the league adopted a professional setup. Jabal Al-Mukaber won the 2009-10 Premier League while Wadi Al-Nes won the Palestine Cup with Beit Ummar and Shabab Al-Khader relegate to the first division.

League table

Top scorers

References 

West Bank Premier League seasons
1
West